This article lists various statistics related to Club Deportivo FAS.

All stats accurate as of 2 April 2022.

Honours
As of 18 May 2022 FAS have won 18 Primera División and one CONCACAF Champions League trophies.

Domestic competitions

League
Primera División de Fútbol de El Salvador and predecessors 
 Champions (18): 1951–1952, 1953–1954, 1957–1958, 1961–1962, 1962, 1977–1978, 1978–1979, 1981, 1984, 1994–1995, 1995–1996, Clausura 2002, Apertura 2002, Apertura 2003, Apertura 2004, Clausura 2005, Apertura 2009. Clausura 2021  (record)

Minor Cups
 American Airlines Cup 
 Champions (1) : 2002
 Copa Salvadorean Classic Soccer Challenge 
 Runners up (1) : 2014
 EDESSA Independence Cup 
 Runners up (1) : 2014

CONCACAF competitions

Official titles
 CONCACAF Champions League and predecessors 
 Champions (1) : 1979
 Copa Interamericana 
 Runners up (1) : 1979
 UNCAF Club Championship 
 Runners up (1) : 1980

Individual awards

Award winners
Top Goalscorer (10)
The following players have won the Goalscorer titles while playing for FAS:

 Omar Muraco (39)  – 1957-58
 Hector Dadderio (29)  – 1959
 Mario Monge (16)  – 1961–62
 David Arnoldo Cabrera (20)  – 1981
 David Arnoldo Cabrera (16)  – 1983
 Ever Hernandez (17)  – 1984
  Williams Reyes (14)  – Clausura 2004
  Nicolás Muñoz (12)  – Apertura 2004
 Néstor Ayala (12)  – Apertura 2006
  Williams Reyes (11)  – 2009 Apertura
 Luis Perea (14)  – Clausura 2018
 Bladimir Diaz (9)  – Clausura 2022

Goalscorers 
Most goals scored : 240 – David Arnoldo Cabrera
Most League goals: TBD – 
Most League goals in a season: 26 – Omar Muraco, Primera División, 1958
Most goals scored by a FAS player in a match: 6 – David Arnoldo Cabrera v. UES (FAS 7-2 UES), 3 January 1980
Most goals scored by a FAS player in an International match: 4 – Alejandro de la Cruz Bentos & Williams Reyes v. Jalapa, 11 October 2002
Most goals scored in CONCACAF competition: 13 – tbd, tbd

All-time top goalscorers 

<small>Note: Players in bold text are still active with Club Deportivo FAS.</small>

Historical goals
kroeker

 Players 

AppearancesCompetitive, professional matches only including substitution, number of appearances as a substitute appears in brackets.Last updated - 

Other appearances records
 Youngest first-team player:  –  TBD v TBD, Primera División, Day Month Year
 Oldest post-Second World War player:  –  TBD v TBD, Primera División, Day Month Year
 Most appearances in Primera División: TBD –  TBD
 Most appearances in Copa Presidente: TBD –  TBD
 Most appearances in International competitions: TBD –  TBD
 Most appearances in CONCACAF competitions: TBD –  TBD
 Most appearances in UNCAF competitions: TBD  –  TBD
 Most appearances in CONCACAF Champions League: TBD –  TBD
 Most appearances in UNCAF Copa: TBD  TBD
 Most appearances in FIFA Club World Cup: 2

 Zózimo

 Most appearances as a foreign player in all competitions: TBD –  TBD
 Most appearances as a foreign player in Primera División: TBD –  TBD
 Most consecutive League appearances: TBD –  TBD – from Month Day, Year at Month Day, Year
 Shortest appearance: –

Records

Scorelines
Record League victory: 11–0 v  Independiente, Primera División, 3 May 1959
Record League Defeat: 7-1 v  Alianza F.C., Primera División, 29 October 1989
Record Cup victory: TBD–TBD v TBD, Presidente Cup, TBD
Record CONCACAF Championship Victory: 7–1 v Jong Colombia, 1979
Record CONCACAF Championship defeat: 5–0 v Club Toluca, 2010–2011
Record UNCAF Victory: 17–0 v Deportivo Jalapa, TBD, 11 October 2002
Record UNCAF defeat: 3–0 v Real C.D. España, 1982

Sequences
Most wins in a row: TBD, TBD – TBD
Most home wins in a row (all competitions): TBD, TBD– TBD
Most home league wins in a row: TBD, TBD – TBD
Most away wins in a row: TBD, TBD – TBD
Most draws in a row: TBD, TBD
Most home draws in a row: TBD, TBD
Most away draws in a row: TBD, TBD
Most defeats in a row: 8, TBD
Most home defeats in a row: TBD, TBD
Most away defeats in a row: TBD, TBD
Longest unbeaten run: 18, 2003 Season
Longest unbeaten run at home: TBD, TBD
Longest unbeaten run away: TBD, TBD
Longest winless run: TBD,  TBD – TBD
Longest winless run at home: TBD, TBD – TBD
Longest winless run away: TBD, TBD – TBD

Seasonal
Most goals in all competitions in a season: TBD – TBD
Most League goals in a season: TBD – TBD
Fewest league goals conceded in a season: 6 – 1981
Most points in a season: TBD – TBD, TBD
Most points in a season (Apertura/Clausura): TBD -, TBD
Most League wins in a season: TBD – TBD
Most League wins in a season (Apertura/Clausura): TBD – TBD
Most home League wins in a season: TBD – TBD
Most away League wins in a season: TBD – TBD

Internationals
Most international caps (total while at club): Alfredo Pacheco – 86 (68) – El Salvador

Attendances
Highest home attendance: TBD, TBD
Highest away attendance: TBD v TBD, TBD, TBD, TBD

Other
 Most seasons appearance: 64, C.D. FAS (1948–present)
 First foreign coach that won a championship in El Salvador: Argentinian Alberto Cevasco with C.D. FAS in 1957–58.
 Most points in a season: 44 points, C.D. FAS (2003 Clausura)
 Most defeats in a final: 8, C.D. FAS (as of Apertura 2012)
 First Foreign Player to be signed by FAS: Costa Rican Ernesto Mora Varga, 1950–1951
 Game 100, FAS lost 4-1 leones (3 April 1955)
 Game 1000, FAS drew 0-0 Chalatenango (1 November 1987)
The highest transfer fee received by the club for a player was $130,000, paid by Cádiz CF for Mágico González on 1983.
The highest transfer fee paid by the club for a player was TBD, paid to TBD for TBD on TBD.

Overall seasons table in Primera División de Fútbol Profesional
{|class="wikitable"
|-bgcolor="#efefef"
!  Pos.
! Club
! Season In D1
! Pl.
! W
! D
! L
! GS
! GA
! Dif.
|-
|align=center bgcolor=|TBA
|C.D. FAS
|align=center |TBD
|align=center|2100
|align=center|960
|align=center|620
|align=center|520
|align=center|3351
|align=center|2360
|align=center|+991
|}

Last updated: 21 October 2015

InternationalsThe following players represented their countries while playing for FAS (the figure in brackets is the number of caps gained while a FAS player. Many of these players also gained caps while at other clubs.) Figures for active players (in bold) last updated 2022  

Argentina
 Agustín Balbuena

Costa Rica
 Donny Grant Zamora
 Allan Oviedo (1)
 Rodolfo Rodríguez
 José Luis Soto

El Salvador
 Gerson Mayen
 Elder José Figueroa (6)

Guatemala
Tomás Gamboa
Roberto Montepeque 
Cristian Noriega
Julio Rodas

Honduras
Eduardo Arriola
 Belarmino Rivera
Walter Martinez

Jamaica
Wolde Harris

Mexico
 Carlos Peña

Nicaragua
Rodolfo Orellana Castro (Fito Castro)

Panama
Roberto Brown
Roberto Chen
Nicolás Muñoz
Orlando Rodríguez
Joel Solanilla

Paraguay
Néstor Ayala

Peru
Fernando Alva
Agustín Castillo
Antonio Serrano

United States
Hugo Perez
David Quezada

Record versus other clubs
 As of 2015-03-15''
The Concacaf opponents below = Official tournament results: 
(Plus a sampling of other results)

Performance in CONCACAF competitions

CONCACAF Cup Winners' Cup: 1 appearance
1997 : Qualifying stage (Central Zone)

CONCACAF Champions' Cup: 12 appearances
Best: Champion in 1979
1963 : Round 1
1971 : Round 1
1978 : Round 2
  (1)::1979 : Champions
1984 : Round 1
1985 : Round 1
1988 : Round 2
1995 : Round 3
1996 : Round 1
1997 : Round 1
2003 : Round 1
2004 : Quarter-final

<div style="text-align:left">

CONCACAF Champions League: 3 appearances
Best: Group stage in 2010–11
2010–11 : Group stage
2012–13 : Group Stage
2014–15 : Group Stage

CONCACAF League: 1 appearances
Best: Quarterfinal in 2018
2018 : Quarterfinal

Copa Interclubes UNCAF: 8 appearances
Best: Third Place in 1980
1978 : Semi-final
1979 : Group Stage
1980 : Third Place
1982 : Semi-final
1999 : Group Stage
2002 : Group Stage
2003 : Group Stage
2004 : Fourth Place
2005 : First Round

References

External links

Football in El Salvador